Hinchingbrooke may refer to one of the following structures near Huntingdon, Cambridgeshire, England:

 Hinchingbrooke Hospital, a small district general hospital
 Hinchingbrooke House, adjacent to and now administered by Hinchingbrooke School
 Hinchingbrooke School, a short distance from Hinchingbrooke Hospital

See also
 Hinchinbrooke (disambiguation)
 Hinchinbrook (disambiguation)